Croceae may refer to:

Croceae (Laconia), a town in the Laconia region of Ancient Greece
Croceae (plant), a tribe of plants in the family Iridaceae